is a train station in Shiraoi, Shiraoi District, Hokkaidō, Japan.

Lines
Hokkaido Railway Company
Muroran Main Line Station H24

Adjacent stations

Railway stations in Hokkaido Prefecture
Railway stations in Japan opened in 1907